John J. Williams may refer to:

 John J. Williams (baseball) (born 1916), American baseball player
 John J. Williams (politician) (1904–1988), American politician
 John J. Williams (soldier) (1843–1865), last soldier to die in the American Civil War
 John James Williams (poet) (1869–1954), Welsh poet
 John James Williams (rugby) or J. J. Williams (1948–2020), Welsh rugby player
 John Joseph Williams (1822–1907), American Roman Catholic bishop
 John Joseph Williams (actor) or Grant Williams (1931–1985), American actor

See also
 John Williams (disambiguation)